Sahebganj may refer to:
 Sahebganj, a town in Jharkhand, India
 Sahebganj district, a district in Jharkhand, India
 Sahebganj, Nepal, a village in Nepal
 Sahebganj, Muzaffarpur (community development block), a block in Muzaffarpur district of Bihar, India.
 Sahebganj, Muzaffarpur (Vidhan Sabha constituency)
 Sahebganj, Paschim Bardhaman, a census town in Paschim Bardhaman district, West Bengal, India
 Sahebganj, Cooch Behar, a village in Cooch Behar district, West Bengal,India